Digswell is an ancient village and former parish in the English county of Hertfordshire which is recorded in the 1086 Domesday Book. The population of the urban area of Digswell in the 2011 Census was 1,632.

Digswell's name may be derived from Deacon's Well. There were two manors, with two water mills, much land under plough, and a large area of woodland. From 1835 the parish of Digswell was included in the Welwyn Poor Law Union, and from 1894 the parish was part of the Welwyn Rural District. The 1911 census recorded the parish of Digswell as covering  and having a population of 401. The small village of Digswell comprised the parish church of St John the Evangelist (13th century, much altered), the 19th century Digswell House (built on the site of a much earlier residence) and a few nearby houses. There were other small hamlets in the parish, notably at Digswell Water on the River Mimram. The parish of Digswell also included Welwyn railway station which opened in 1850 on the Great Northern Railway to serve the village of Welwyn, just over a mile to the west of the station. In the early 20th century an area called "High Welwyn" began to develop around the railway station.

On 30 May 1919 part of the estate once belonging to Lord Cowper of Panshanger was bought at auction by a group of pioneers of the Garden City Movement including Ebenezer Howard. Adjoining land was purchased later that year, and a company called Welwyn Garden City Limited was formed on 20 April 1920 with the aim of building a new garden city. The land earmarked for the town straddled the parishes of Hatfield, Welwyn, Tewin and Digswell. A new civil parish called Welwyn Garden City was created on 1 October 1921 from parts of these four parishes. Digswell parish ceded  to the new parish, representing over half its area, with the transferred territory including the original Digswell village. The remaining Digswell parish was left covering the area broadly north of the Mimram, with the main population centre being the High Welwyn area that was growing up around the station. The station was renamed Welwyn North in 1926, following the opening of a new permanent station for Welwyn Garden City to the south. High Welwyn gradually also became known as Digswell. The civil parish of Digswell was finally abolished in 1935, merging with the neighbouring parish of Welwyn on 1 April 1935. In 1931 the parish had a population of 644.

The residential workshop for sculptors, artists and musicians sponsored by the Digswell Arts Trust, was once located in Digswell House. Part of the southern Parish Boundary Baulk (raised bank) between the ecclesiastical parishes of Digswell and Hatfield may still be seen in Sherrardspark Wood, a local woodland, nature reserve and Site of Special Scientific Interest.(5) Much of Digswell is now part of the borough of Welwyn Hatfield.

The area known as Digswell today is the largely residential area centred on Welwyn North station. It has a population of about 1600, with a shop or two, and a pub called the Cowper Arms. Notable past residents here include Kenneth Allsop, Alan Brazil, Ron Pickering, Graham Richard James, the police reformer Sir Arthur Young, H.G. Wells and American actor Barry Chapman.  When first developed, this residential area was known as "High Welwyn" before later taking on the name of the old parish on the south side of the nearby Hertford Road.

Further reading
 Dora Ward, 'Digswell from Domesday to Garden City' first published 1953 and since reprinted.

References

External links

 Digswell Community website

Villages in Hertfordshire
Former civil parishes in Hertfordshire
Welwyn